A Bank card is a card issued by a bank to give a client access to funds in various ways. It may also refer to:

 Bankcard, a defunct Australian credit card scheme
 Bankard, a credit card issuer in the Philippines
 North American Bancard, a card transaction services provider
 Magnetic stripe card, commonly used for credit cards and debit cards